The White Dragon Horse, known as Bai Long Ma in Chinese, is one of the main characters in the 16th-century Chinese novel Journey to the West. He is Tang Sanzang's steed who later became Babu Tianlong Guangli Bodhisattva (八部天龙广力菩萨) at the end of novel.

Journey to the West
In Journey to the West, Bai Longma is actually a dragon prince Ao Lie who is the third son of the Dragon King of the West Sea. He once set a fire that destroyed a pearl that was a gift from the Jade Emperor. He was about to be executed for committing this offense when Guanyin appeared and pleaded for his life. The dragon prince was spared from death and banished to Yingchou Stream (鷹愁澗) in Shepan Mountain (蛇盤山). When Tang Sanzang is crossing the stream, the prince appears in the form of a gigantic white dragon and swallows Tang's white horse in one gulp. The dragon then fights with Sun Wukong but is no match and retreats underwater. Sun Wukong hears from an Earth Deity that the dragon was placed there by Guanyin so he goes to find the bodhisattva and learns of the dragon's origin. The dragon prince had been waiting there for Tang Sanzang but did not recognise the latter and ate his horse as a result. The dragon then transforms into the White Dragon Horse and serves as Tang Sanzang's steed for the rest of the latter's journey.

When Tang Sanzang was captured by the Yellow Robe Demon, the White Dragon Horse transforms himself a young man and attempts to save Tang Sanzang, but fails and he escapes to inform Zhu Bajie, who in turn brings back Sun Wukong to save Tang Sanzang.

At the end of the novel, the White Dragon Horse is ordained as the Great Strength Bodhisattva of the Eight Heavenly Sections (八部天龙广力菩萨) and Dragon Horse of the Eight Heavenly Sections (八部天龍馬). He turns into a white dragon and wraps his body around one of the pillars in the Great Leiyin Temple.

Religion

Bai Longma is worshipped as a deity in Chinese folk religion. Located in Rua Yai, Mueang Suphan Buri District, Suphan Buri, Thailand, the City Pillar Shrine (ศาลเจ้าพ่อหลักเมืองสุพรรณบุรี) has built a golden statue of Bai Longma, along with Tang Sanzang, Sun Wukong, Zhu Bajie and Sha Wujing.

Adaptations of Journey to the West

 In the 1986 television series, the White Dragon Horse was getting married when his fiancée, the Wansheng Princess, was cheating on him. He got so angry that he burned the pearl given to him as a gift by the Jade Emperor and was banished to Yingchou Stream as punishment. Sometime after being punished, the White Dragon Horse ate Tang Sanzang's horse when the horse ran off. When Sun Wukong saw that the horse was missing, he fought the dragon prince demanding his master's horse back. After fighting with the prince, Wukong went to the Dragon King's palace to discuss the dragon he had fought. When Guanyin appeared, Sun Wukong told her about the dragon that ate his master's horse. Guanyin called the prince out and instructed him to be Tang Sanzang's steed for the rest of the journey.

 In the anime and manga Saiyuki, the character of Jeep is loosely based on the White Dragon Horse. He is a small shapeshifting dragon that transforms into the Sanzo party's mode of transportation on their journey: a Jeep (hence the name). He is Hakkai's pet and can breathe fire. In his past life, instead of being a son of the Dragon King of the West (Sea), he was the Dragon King himself, named Goujun. He was also a commanding officer of Heaven's army and Kenren Taisho's immediate superior.

 In Monkey Magic, the White Dragon Horse is a female instead and she goes by the name Runlay.

See also
 Longma
 List of media adaptations of Journey to the West

References

Journey to the West characters
Fictional therianthropes
Chinese dragons
Horses in Chinese mythology
Buddhism in China